John Bolton Rogerson (1809–1859) was an English poet. He worked in a mercantile firm and afterwards with a solicitor in Manchester; kept a bookshop from 1834 to 1841; contributed to newspapers, and subsequently engaged in journalistic and other enterprises. He published several volumes of poems.

Life 
John Bolton Rogerson was born at Manchester on 20 January 1809, the son of James Rogerson by his wife, Elisabeth. At the age of thirteen he left school and began work in a mercantile firm, but was afterwards placed with a solicitor. Law being distasteful, he opened in 1834 a bookshop in Manchester, which he carried on until 1841. The next few years were devoted to literary work, and in 1849 he was appointed registrar of the Manchester cemetery at Harpurhey. He was an amateur actor, was president for some years of the Manchester Shakespearean Society, and was for a short time on the staff of the Manchester Theatre Royal. In youth he had written a play in three acts, called The Baron of Manchester, which was produced at a local theatre. He also lectured on literary and educational subjects.

From early years he was an eager, desultory reader, and soon became a writer of verse, but destroyed most of his juvenile efforts. He first appeared in print in 1826 in the Manchester Guardian, and in the following year wrote for the Liverpool Kaleidoscope. In 1828 he joined John Hewitt in editing the Phœnix, or Manchester Literary Journal, a performance which lasted only a few months. He was joint-editor of the Falcon, or Journal of Literature, Manchester, 1831; and edited the Oddfellows' Magazine from 1841 to 1848; the Chaplet, a Poetical Offering for the Lyceum Bazaar, 1841, and the Festive Wreath, 1842 (both published at Manchester).

Chronic rheumatism disabled him about 1855 from continuing his duties as registrar. He afterwards kept a tavern in Newton Street, Ancoats, Manchester, and in 1857 was master of a school at Accrington. In the succeeding year he was awarded a government pension of 50l.; then he retired to the Isle of Man, where he died on 15 October 1859, and was interred at Kirk Braddan, near Douglas. His wife was Mary Anne, born Horabin, by whom he left several children.

Works 

His separate publications were:

 Rhyme, Romance, and Revery, London, 1840; 2nd edition 1852.
 A Voice from the Town, and other Poems, 1842.
 The Wandering Angel, and other Poems, 1844.
 Poetical Works, 1850, with portrait.
 Flowers for all Seasons (verses and essays), 1854.
 Musings in Many Moods, 1859, which contains most of the poems in the preceding volumes.

According to Charles William Sutton, "His works, though pleasing, lack originality and vigour."

References

Sources 

 

Attribution:

Further reading 

 Dawson, James (3 June 1871). "Lancashire Poets. V. John Bolton Rogerson". The Manchester Weekly Times.—Supplement. p. 9.
 Ockerbloom, John Mark, ed. "Rogerson, John Bolton, 1809-1859". The Online Books Page. Retrieved 6 October 2022.
 Procter, Richard Wright (1860). Literary Reminiscences and Gleanings. Manchester: Thomas Dinham & Co.; London: Simpkin, Marshall, & Co. pp. 4–6, 79, 96, 127.
 Procter, Richard Wright (1880). Memorials of Bygone Manchester. Manchester: Palmer and Howe; London: Simpkin, Marshall, & Co. pp. 149–171.
 "Memoir of John Bolton Rogerson". The Odd Fellows' Quarterly Magazine. Vol. 9. No. 5. January 1847. pp. 225–227.

1809 births
1859 deaths
19th-century English poets